Los Dioses is a collaborative studio album by Puerto Rican rapper Anuel AA and Puerto Rican singer Ozuna. It was released on January 22, 2021, by Real Hasta la Muerte, Aura Music and Sony Music Latin.  The production on the album was handled by multiple producers including: Tainy, DJ Luian, Ovy on the Drums, Foreign Teck, Súbelo Neo, Mambo Kingz and Mvsis. The pair previously collaborated on numerous singles, including "China", "Adicto", "Brindemos" and "Cambio".

Los Dioses was supported by three singles: "Los Dioses", "Antes" and "Municiones". The album received generally positive reviews from music critics and was a commercial success. It debuted at number ten on the US Billboard 200 and number one on both the US Top Latin Albums and US Latin Rhythm Albums charts, earning 29,000 album-equivalent units in its first week.

Critical reception 

Kyann-Sian Williams of NME praises the collaboration of Anuel AA and Ozuna, calling the collaboration "the coming together of two musical titans". Williams spoke on how the smooth sultry vocals of Ozuna and the deep smoky vocals of Anuel AA coming together with music that transcends the reggaeton genre. She said "Ozuna and Anuel AA have penned hits deeply imbued with timeless grooves that rival those of the biggest stars in the world right now". She also said "With a worldly shimmer and energetic drumming, this is an aching reminder us of the partying days that many of us are still missing." Ultimately, Williams gave the album a rating of 4 stars out of 5.

Commercial performance 
Los Dioses debuted at number one on the US Top Latin Albums chart, earning 29,000 album-equivalent units (including 6,000 copies as pure album sales) in its first week, according to MRC Data. This became Anuel AA's third number one and Ozuna's fifth on the chart. The album also debuted at number ten on the US Billboard 200 and US Latin Rhythm Albums charts respectively. In addition, the album accumulated a total of 34.4 million on-demand streams for its songs.

All twelve songs from the album debuted on the US Hot Latin Songs chart, with two songs charting in the top ten. "Antes" debuted at number five and "Los Dioses" debuted at number eight on the chart respectively.

Track listing 

Notes

Charts

Weekly charts

Year-end charts

References 

2021 albums
Albums produced by Tainy
Anuel AA albums
Collaborative albums
Ozuna (singer) albums